Huai Sai' may refer to several places in Thailand:

Huai Sai, Mae Rim
Huai Sai, Prachuap Khiri Khan
Huai Sai, San Kamphaeng